Herb Parker Stadium is an outdoor 4,500-seat multi-purpose stadium in the north central United States, located on the campus of Minot State University in Minot, North Dakota.  The venue is home to the MSU Beavers football and women's soccer teams. It was named in 1983 for Herb Parker, the long-time coach and athletic director.

The Beavers are members of the Northern Sun Intercollegiate Conference (NSIC) in NCAA Division II. Prior to 2012, they belonged to the Dakota Athletic Conference in the National Association of Intercollegiate Athletics (NAIA).

The stadium is undergoing a multiple phase improvement project, which includes construction of a press box, concessions, ticketing office, a lobby, merchandising area, and a video scoreboard.

References

External links
 Minot State Beavers Official Site
 Herbert Parker Stadium

Sports venues in Minot, North Dakota
American football venues in North Dakota
College football venues
College soccer venues in the United States
Soccer venues in North Dakota